The Gender Recognition Reform (Scotland) Bill is a bill passed by the Scottish Parliament. The bill seeks to amend the Gender Recognition Act 2004 of the Parliament of the United Kingdom, making it simpler for people to change their legal gender. On 17 January 2023, the United Kingdom government used section 35 of the Scotland Act 1998 to block the bill from receiving royal assent, the first time section 35 has been used.

Background 

In July 2002, the European Court of Human Rights ruled in the Goodwin v United Kingdom case that a trans person's inability to change the sex on their birth certificate was a breach of their rights under Article 8 (privacy) and Article 12 (marriage) of the European Convention on Human Rights. Following this judgement, the UK government had to introduce new legislation to comply, which became law as the Gender Recognition Act 2004 (GRA). To obtain a gender recognition certificate (GRC) under the GRA, an applicant must a) provide evidence of a diagnosis of gender dysphoria; b) have lived in their "acquired gender" for two years; and c) make a statutory declaration that they intend to live in the acquired gender until death.

In a June 2020 report, the European Commission classified the legal procedures for gender recognition of 28 European countries into five categories based on the barriers to access. This placed the UK's Gender Recognition Act 2004 in the second from bottom category with "intrusive medical requirements" that lag behind international human rights standards. The procedures have also been described as costly, bureaucratic, and time-consuming for trans people, with successful applicants having to wait two years until they can change their legal gender.

The issue of gender recognition is devolved in Scotland, which allows the Scottish parliament, if it wishes, to legislate for a different policy to that of England and Wales. In 2004, the Scottish Parliament passed a motion to consent to Westminster's GRA, so that a uniform system of gender recognition would be in place throughout the UK. A 2018 consultation in England and Wales found that a majority of the over 100,000 respondents were in favour of removing most of the requirements for a GRC; despite this, in 2020, the government in Westminster announced that it would not legislate to relax the requirements. Separately, the Scottish government also consulted on reforming the law: an initial consultation on the principles of the bill which took place between November 2017 and March 2018 found a majority of the 15,500 respondents in favour of the bill; and the second consultation on a draft bill, taking place between November 2019 and March 2020, also found majority support.

Legislative process

Draft stage 
The Scottish National Party (SNP) committed to "review and reform gender recognition law, so it's in line with international best practice for people who are Transgender" in their manifesto for the 2016 Scottish Parliament election, which they won. After the consultations ended, the Scottish government intended to introduce the bill to Parliament in 2020, but was forced by the COVID-19 pandemic in Scotland to delay consideration until after the 2021 Scottish Parliament election.

The 2021 election saw the SNP returned to government, this time in a coalition with the Scottish Greens rather than as a minority government; both parties featured the bill in their manifestos. The Bute House Agreement between the two parties committed to introducing a Gender Recognition Reform Bill before the end of May 2022.

Stage 1 
The bill was introduced on 2 March 2022, by Shona Robison, the Cabinet Secretary for Social Justice, Housing and Local Government. The bill lowers the age people can change their legal gender from 18 to 16, removes the requirement of a medical diagnosis of gender dysphoria, and reduces the waiting time from two years to six months of living in an acquired gender. Also issued on the same day were a delegated powers memorandum, financial memorandum, policy memorandum, and statement of legislative competence.

The bill was subject to a mandatory consultation–its third–by the Scottish Parliament's Equalities, Human Rights and Civil Justice Committee. This committee was designated as the lead committee and ran thirteen evidence sessions. The Delegated Powers and Law Reform Committee of the Scottish Parliament, issued a report to the Equalities, Human Rights and Civil Justice Committee, on 16 May 2022, regarding the delegated powers memorandum for the bill, which reported they were content with the delegated powers provisions contained within the bill. The Finance and Public Administration Committee held a consultation on the financial memorandum, which received six responses, all of which were forwarded to the Equalities, Human Rights and Civil Justice Committee. The committee took no action based on the results of its consultation and recommended no changes to the financial memorandum.

The Stage 1 report, from the Equalities, Human Rights and Civil Justice Committee, recommended that the general principles be approved.

Stage 1 vote 
The bill was voted on by the full parliament on 27 October 2022 and passed by a majority of 88 to 33, with 4 abstentions and 4 members not voting.

Stage 2 
A number of amendments were proposed made to the bill at Stage 2, the majority of which were not passed. The Finance and Public Administration Committee published an updated financial memorandum on 7 December 2022 on the bill and noted the updates at its meeting on 13 December 2022.

Stage 3 
The bill was heard at Stage 3 on 20–21 December 2022 for amendments to the bill. The final debate and vote was held on 22 December 2022.

Equalities, Human Rights and Civil Justice Committee 
On 19 December 2022, the day before the Stage 3 debate began, the Equalities, Human Rights and Civil Justice Committee held an evidence session on the bill. They heard from two United Nations representatives, Victor Madrigal-Borloz, an expert on gender identity and United Nations Independent Expert on Protection against violence and discrimination based on sexual orientation and gender identity, and Reem Alsalem, United Nations Special Rapporteur on Violence Against Women. Madrigal-Borloz described the Scottish bill as a "significant step forward", while Alsalem said it "would potentially open the door for violent males who identify as men to abuse the process of acquiring a gender certificate and the rights that are associated with it", a view that was disputed by Madrigal-Borloz, who said it would bring Scotland in line with international human right standards.

Stage 3 vote 
The bill was voted on by the full parliament on 22 December 2022 and passed by a majority of 86 to 39, with 0 abstentions and 4 members not voting. The announcement of the result was accompanied by cheers from supporters in the chamber, and shouts of "shame on you" from protesters in the public gallery.

Royal assent 

On 16 January 2023, Scotland Secretary Alister Jack announced that the he would make an order under section 35 of the Scotland Act 1998, which would prevent the bill from proceeding to royal assent. Jack cited concerns that the bill would adversely impact the UK-wide Equality Act 2010 as the reason for the tabling of the motion before the Westminster Parliament; equal opportunities are a reserved matter under the Scotland Act. The order using the negative procedure was made on 17 January 2023 and entered into force on the next day. The negative procedure means that the order is in force unless either house of Parliament votes to disagree with the order within 40 days. The final day to vote a disagreement was 27 February 2023. This was the first time royal assent was refused to a bill passed by the Scottish Parliament since its creation in 1999. As similar powers regarding the Senedd and Northern Ireland Assembly have never been used, this is the first post-legislative veto of a bill since Queen Anne refused assent to the Scottish Militia Bill in 1708. On 17 January 2023, Jack made a formal statement to the House of Commons that he was using section 35 of the Scotland Act and set out his reasons for doing so. On 18 January the statement of Jack that was made in the Commons was presented and debated in the House of Lords without a formal vote on the matter.

On 17 January 2023, Stephen Flynn the SNP leader at Westminster requested and was granted an emergency debate on the use of the Section 35 order. The debate was on the question "This House has considered the Government’s decision to use section 35 of the Scotland Act 1998 with regard to the Gender Recognition Reform (Scotland) Bill." The debate lasted for two hours and the house voted 318 to 71 in favour of the UK government position that the house had considered the matter.

On 24 January 2023, Flynn tabled a Prayer against the section 35 Order which was worded as follows: “That a humble address be addressed to His Majesty praying that The Gender Recognition Reform (Scotland) Bill (Prohibition on Submission for Royal Assent) Order 2023 of 17 January 2023, a copy of which is this House was presented on January 17, 2023, be annulled.”

Opinion on the bill

Support 
The bill was supported by feminist, LGBT, and human rights campaign organisations such as Amnesty International, Stonewall, Rape Crisis Scotland, Equality Network, Engender, Scottish Trans Alliance, and Scottish Women's Aid. The vast majority of SNP and Scottish Labour parliamentarians, as well as all Scottish Green and Scottish Liberal Democrat MSPs supported the bill, as did three of the Scottish Conservative members.

The bill is similar to the one adopted in the Republic of Ireland. In Northern Ireland, the bill was supported by Sinn Féin, the Alliance Party, and the Social Democratic and Labour Party, whose politicians and MPs raised the possibility of adopting a similar bill.

Opposition 
The bill was opposed by the Scottish Conservatives, the LGB Alliance, For Women Scotland, Fair Play for Women, and the Catholic Bishops' Conference of Scotland.  Nine SNP members voted against the bill at stage 3, which was reported  in Euronews as "the biggest rebellion against the government by its own party in the last 15 years". The Minister for Community Safety, the SNP's Ash Regan, resigned before the Stage 2 vote, saying she was concerned the bill could have "negative implications for the safety and dignity of women and girls".

Opinion polls 
A January 2022 poll commissioned for the BBC, conducted by Savanta ComRes, found 57% of Scots supported making it easier to obtain a Gender Recognition Certificate; a majority opposed reducing the age for this from 18 to 16. The same poll found that over 40% of people supported self-identification, compared to 37% against it. A 2023 YouGov poll commissioned by The Times found that two thirds of Scottish voters opposed key aspects of the bill, particularly those relating the lowering of the minimum age for applying for a GRC.

Opinion on royal assent 
Soon after the passage of the bill, academic commentary began to moot the possibility of an invocation of section 35 of the Scotland Act 1998 to block the bill. On 21 December 2022, Dr Michael Foran, a lecturer in public law at the University of Glasgow, floated the idea that the bill could be blocked as it infringed on the operation of reserved matters. On 23 December 2022, Prime Minister Rishi Sunak said that it would be "completely reasonable" for the United Kingdom government to block the bill, citing concerns for "women and children's safety". On 16 January 2023, in response to continued reports that the government was planning to block the bill, Scotland's first minister Nicola Sturgeon called the prospect an "outrage", and stated the UK government was using transgender people as a "political weapon". Following Jack's announcement in the House of Commons of the UK that the bill would be blocked, Sturgeon said that the dispute would "inevitably end up in court" and that the Scottish government would "vigorously defend" the bill.

Kemi Badenoch, the minister for women and equalities, suggested that gender recognition certificates and associated government documents would no longer be recognised in England and Wales if they were from places "where there is a clear indication that the country now no longer has a system at least as rigorous as those in the Gender Recognition Act 2004."
On 17 January 2023, the Westminster government released a policy statement on their decision to invoke Section 35. In the statement they set out three primary reasons why they believed the Scottish bill impinged upon reserved matters: firstly, a potential impact on provision of single-sex services authorised under the Equality Act 2010 as a result of creating "two parallel and very different regimes" for issuing gender recognition certificates; secondly, a potential  increased risk of fraudulent applications; thirdly, potential impacts on the operation of the Equality Act 2010.

Alister Jack and Kemi Badenoch were invited by the Scottish Parliament's Equalities, Human Rights and Civil Justice Committee to give evidence about their decision to block the bill; both declined to attend.

Lord Hope of Craighead, formerly deputy president of the UK Supreme Court defended the legality of the UK government's decision and said that the possibility of success of a legal challenge against the decision by the Scottish Government was "very low". Former Labour shadow attorney general Baroness Chakrabarti, also defended the legality of the government's decision. Former Labour Lord Chancellor Lord Falconer of Thoroton has tweeted that the UK government’s reasons are not justified.

Nancy Kelley, the chief executive of Stonewall, and Colin Macfarlane, the LGBTQ+ rights campaign's Scotland director, said by reference to Section 28, the legislation that had prohibited the "promotion of homosexuality" by local authorities, Sunak was risking "re-toxifying" his government's record on LGBTQ+ rights and introducing "an effective trans travel ban". Kelley and Macfarlane were quoted as saying "the UK government sees trans people as a threat to be contained, not citizens to be respected." A Cabinet Office spokesperson responded by saying that trans people "have not and will not be banned" from entering the UK. LGBTIQ activists criticized the Labour Party and Keir Starmer for not opposing the governing Conservative Party in blocking the bill in the UK. Some who were British unionists were reported to have switched support for Scottish independence, with one being quoted as saying: "Now, I understand that independence is the only way to achieve [progressive] goals in the face of a highly conservative UK government."

See also 
 History of transgender people in the United Kingdom
 Legal status of transgender people
 LGBT rights in Scotland
 LGBT rights in the United Kingdom
 Transgender rights in the United Kingdom

References 

Transgender law in the United Kingdom
LGBT law in the United Kingdom
2004 in LGBT history
2022 in LGBT history
2022 in British politics
Political controversies in the United Kingdom